Kaikōura is a town on the east coast of the South Island of New Zealand. It is located on State Highway 1, 180 km north of Christchurch.

The town is the governmental seat of the territorial authority of the Kaikōura District, which is politically a part of the Canterbury region. Kaikōura was the first local authority in the Southern Hemisphere to achieve recognition by the EarthCheck Community Standard.

The infrastructure of Kaikōura was heavily damaged in the 2016 Kaikōura earthquake, with one of the two deaths near the town.

History

Early Māori history 
Māori have long been resident in Kaikōura and archeological evidence of moa bones suggesting that they hunted moa there. After the moa numbers declined, Kaikōura was still an attractive place to live with its abundance of sea food. Ngāi Tahu had been resident in the Kaikoura area since at least 1670. Numerous pā sites are located around Kaikōura. The numbers vary between 14 and 40.

Captain James Cook saw Kaikōura in 1770 but did not land there. He reported seeing four double hulled canoes approaching HMS Endeavour containing 57 Māori.

In 1827 or 1828, Kaikōura was the site of a battle between the Ngāti Toa (led by Te Rauparaha) and Ngāi Tahu. Several hundred Ngāi Tahu were killed or captured. Ngāi Tahu were surprised by the Ngati Toa raiding party as they were expecting a visit from Ngāti Kahungunu with whom they were friends.

Whaling stations 
A whaling station was first established by Robert Fyffe in 1842 at Kaikōura. The Fyffe family was the first European family to settle in Kaikōura. John Guard and his family joined Fyffe sometime between 1844 and 1846. 40 men were employed at the whaling station initially. In 1845, he purchased a second whaling station at South Bay. This second whaling station (Fyffe's Village) became the commercial centre of Kaikōura until 1867. Fyffe diversified into shipping and farming due to the decline in whale numbers. The Marlborough Express newspaper commented in 1866 that "whales seemed to have abandoned coming to Kaikōura". The whaling stations continued until 1922.

Mt. Fyffe owes its name to the Fyffe family. The cottage that the Fyffe family lived in, built in 1842, still stands, and is now a tourist attraction operated by Heritage New Zealand.  The construction of the cottage is unusual in that the supporting foundations of the house are made of whalebone.

European settlement 
The New Zealand government purchased land north of Kaikōura from Ngati Toa in 1847. This was challenged by Ngāi Tahu who said that Ngati Toa had no right to sell land that did not belong to them. In 1857, the New Zealand Government made an offer for land between the Ashley and Waiau Uwha rivers for 200 pounds which was signed by Ngāi Tahu. Other land deals were completed in the area leaving small reserves for local Māori. These reserves were reduced after 1900 when the New Zealand government compulsorily acquired further land for the proposed railway and "scenic" purposes.

From the 1850s, land that had been acquired was sold to European settlers who most often started sheep farms in the area. Many small blocks were sold around the Kaikōura peninsula and in the 1870s roads and bridges were built. A small wharf was completed in 1863. The Inland Kaikōura Road to Rotherham was completed by 1888. The road that became state highway 1 was started in the 1890s across the Hundalee Hills with bridges across the rivers completed in 1914.

A total of 59 Norfolk pines were planted from 1900 along the Esplanade. These now have "protected trees" status from the Kaikōura District Council.

20th century 
The population increased as a result of the extensive works required to built the railway in 1935. In December 1945, the Christchurch to Picton railway line was officially opened at Kaikōura. 5000 people came out to celebrate the occasion. The population fell slightly after the railway was completed.

Between 1945 and 1960, over-fishing led to a decline in the crayfish numbers.

In 1962 the roll-on/roll-off car ferry between Wellington and Picton brought more visitors to Kaikōura. There was only one motel (with 40 beds) prior to 1962.

There are reports that between 1963 and 1964, 248 sperm whales in Kaikoura waters were killed during the last of the whaling activity in New Zealand.

Kaikōura struggled economically during the 1970s. In 1975 there were 304 motel beds and a further 500 camp ground beds and hotel beds. The Marlborough Regional Development Council noted that there was investment in accommodation but not in tourist attractions at this time.

By 1975 the decline in crayfish numbers had extended to other fish species. In 1975 there were 97 registered fishing vessels operating out of Kaikoura.

The restructuring of the economy following the election of the Labour government in 1984 also affected Kaikōura adversely. Farm incomes dropped. Public sector employment was affected badly. There were 170 jobs lost in a town of 3000.

In 1985 a group of local Kaikoura people established a tourist centre, and began promoting Kaikōura as a tourist destination. The focus at that stage was on the walking opportunities and the scenery.

Whale-watching was established as a tourist venture in Kaikōura in 1987. Local Māori leaders were concerned about local unemployment, and mortgaged their houses to buy a  boat to start up a whale watching business to see the local sperm whales. In the first year of business, 3000 tourists took the opportunity to see whales. This has greatly expanded to more than 100,000 per annum.

2016 Kaikōura earthquake 

On 14 November 2016, a 7.8-magnitude earthquake struck the South Island just after midnight. It left two people dead (one near the town and one in the adjacent Hurunui District) and triggered a small tsunami. One thousand tourists and hundreds of residents were stranded in Kaikōura after the earthquake cut off train and vehicle access. New Zealand Air Force helicopters ferried many people out of Kaikoura initially with the New Zealand navy sending HMNZS Canterbury to ferry many hundreds of tourists out.

1700 construction workers completed two million man hours to repair the quake-damaged route along State Highway 1 after the 2016 Kaikōura earthquake. It reopened on 15 December 2017. The repairs included fixing almost  of damaged road and a similar length of railway line. The repairs cost NZ$1.1 billion.

The rebuild after the 2016 earthquake had replaced or upgraded many of Kaikoura District Council's assets. These included replacing the oldest water mains built in the 1920s and many roads. This has left Kaikoura better placed financially in 2021 than many councils as they do not have to replace these in the next 30 years as part of their long term planning.

Geography

The stretch of coastline stretching roughly between the mouths of the Conway and Waiau Toa / Clarence Rivers is generally known as the Kaikōura coast. This coast is unusual for the South Island east coast, as there is very little coastal plain, with the Seaward Kaikōura Range, a branch of the Southern Alps / Kā Tiritiri o te Moana, rising straight from the ocean.

The town of Kaikōura has the Seaward Kaikōuras as a backdrop.  One of the walking tracks for visitors is the Mt. Fyffe track, which winds up Mt. Fyffe, and gives a panoramic view of the Kaikōura peninsula from the summit.

The Kaikōura Peninsula extends into the sea south of the town, and the resulting upwelling currents bring an abundance of marine life from the depths of the nearby Hikurangi Trench. The town owes its origin to this effect, since it developed as a centre for the whaling industry.  The name Kaikōura means 'meal of crayfish' (kai – food/meal, kōura – crayfish) and the crayfish industry still plays a role in the economy of the region. However Kaikōura has now become a popular tourist destination, mainly for whale watching (the sperm whale watching is well developed) and swimming with or near dolphins.

Climate

Governance
Local governance for Kaikōura is provided by the Kaikōura District Council (Ko te kaunihera ā rohe o Kaikōura). The council consists of a mayor and seven councillors. Elections for positions on the council are held every three years in conjunction with nationwide local elections. Kaikoura is part of the Kaikoura electorate. Stuart Smith of the National Party was the current member of parliament after the 2020 election.

Demographics

Kaikōura had a population of 2,223 at the 2018 New Zealand census, an increase of 213 people (10.6%) since the 2013 census, and an increase of 21 people (1.0%) since the 2006 census. There were 873 households. There were 1,107 males and 1,116 females, giving a sex ratio of 0.99 males per female. The median age was 47.7 years (compared with 37.4 years nationally), with 318 people (14.3%) aged under 15 years, 354 (15.9%) aged 15 to 29, 981 (44.1%) aged 30 to 64, and 573 (25.8%) aged 65 or older.

Ethnicities were 83.3% European/Pākehā, 19.6% Māori, 0.8% Pacific peoples, 5.0% Asian, and 3.1% other ethnicities (totals add to more than 100% since people could identify with multiple ethnicities).

The proportion of people born overseas was 18.2%, compared with 27.1% nationally.

Although some people objected to giving their religion, 48.2% had no religion, 40.6% were Christian, 0.3% were Hindu, 0.3% were Muslim, 0.5% were Buddhist and 3.4% had other religions.

Of those at least 15 years old, 231 (12.1%) people had a bachelor or higher degree, and 447 (23.5%) people had no formal qualifications. The median income was $30,200, compared with $31,800 nationally. The employment status of those at least 15 was that 969 (50.9%) people were employed full-time, 315 (16.5%) were part-time, and 30 (1.6%) were unemployed.

Culture
In Māori mythology, Kaikōura Peninsula (Taumanu o te Waka o Māui) was the seat where Māui sat when he fished the North Island (Te Ika a Maāi) up from the depths of the sea.

The tangata whenua of Kaikōura and all of the Kaikōura District are Te Runanga o Ngāi Tahu, and they hold customary tribal authority over this entire area (rohe). Takahanga Marae, a marae (tribal meeting ground) of Ngāi Tahu and its Te Rūnanga o Kaikōura branch, is located in Kaikōura.  The current marae building was opened in 2001. It includes the Maru Kaitatea wharenui (meeting house). Cliff Whiting was one of many Māori and Pākehā artists who contributed carving and artworks for the wharenui.

Wildlife and conservation 
The Kaikōura canyon is a submarine canyon located southwest of the Kaikōura Peninsula.  It is a southern branch of the Hikurangi Trench that extends northwards up the New Zealand east coast. The canyon has been described as a "bio-diversity hotspot", and upwelling of currents from the deep ocean provide feeding grounds for a diverse range of seabirds and marine mammals along the Kaikōura coast. 

An incorporated society, Te Korowai o Te Tai o Marokura, Kaikōura Coastal Marine Guardians (Te Korowai) was formed in 2005 to develop use and protection strategies and actions for the Kaikōura coast.   The work of the society led to the passing of the Kaikōura (Te Tai o Marokura) Marine Management Act in August 2014. This Act established the Kaikōura marine management area, including a new marine reserve, sanctuaries and protections for whales and fur seals, and established new fishing regulations. It also recognised taiapure (traditional Māori fishing grounds which include areas of special cultural or spiritual significance).

Marine mammals 
A wide variety of marine mammals can be seen in the Kaikōura region, including whales, dolphins, and seals.  The Marine Mammals Protection Act 1978 provides legal protection for these animals, and regulations set conditions that govern human behaviour in the vicinity of marine mammals. Permits are required for commercial tourist operations associated with marine mammals.

Whales 
Whale watching is a popular tourist attraction for Kaikōura, and is an important contributor to the local economy.  Sperm whales can be observed all year, typically around 23 km offshore, but sometimes closer to shore.  Humpback whales are often seen in June and July during their winter migration, and orca can be seen from December to March.

Dolphins 
Several species of dolphin can be seen in the waters off Kaikōura, including Dusky dolphins, and the endangered Hector's dolphin.

New Zealand fur seals 
There is a large and readily observed colony of southern fur seals at the eastern edge of the town.  At low tide, better viewing of the seals can be had as the ocean gives way to a rocky base which is easily navigable by foot for quite some distance.

Seabirds 
New Zealand has an usually high diversity of shags, penguins, petrels and albatross species, leading to claims that the country is the "seabird capital of the world".  Some of these seabird species are in significant decline, and many are critically endangered. Notable seabirds that are seen off Kaikōura include:
 fourteen species of albatross: Wandering, Antipodean, Northern royal, Southern royal, Black-browed, Campbell, White-capped, Salvin's, Chatham, Buller's, Atlantic ocean yellow-nosed, Indian ocean yellow-nosed, Light-mantled, Sooty
 ten species of petrel: Cook's, Grey-faced, Cape, Black, White-chinned, Westland, Grey, White-headed, Mottled, Soft-plumaged
 seven species of shearwater: Buller's, Sooty, Hutton's, Fluttering, Short-tailed, Flesh-footed, Pink-footed  
 four species of skua: Arctic, Pomarine, Long-tailed, Brown
 four species of storm petrel: White-faced, Wilson's, Grey-backed, Black-bellied
 four species of penguin:Little, Yellow-eyed, Erect-crested, Chinstrap
 two species of giant petrel: Southern Giant Petrel, Northern Giant Petrel
 
Other notable seabirds observed off Kaikōura include: Antarctic fulmar, Fairy Prion, Grey Phalarope, Black-billed gull, Arctic tern, Black-fronted tern and Common diving petrel.  Also regularly seen are Pied shags, Little shag, Spotted shag, Australasian gannet, Southern black-backed gull, Red-billed gull, White-fronted tern.

From a local conservation perspective, particularly notable seabirds in the Kaikōura region include the Hutton's shearwater, the Red-billed gull, and the Little penguin.

Hutton's shearwater 

The Hutton's shearwater (Puffinus huttoni) or Kaikōura tītī is an endangered seabird in the family Procellariidae.  It is found in waters around Australia and New Zealand but it only breeds in the Seaward Kaikōura Range in New Zealand.  It is the only seabird in the world that breeds in an alpine environment.  Nests have been found at elevations from 1200 to 1800metres.  The Kowhai Valley and Shearwater Stream Important Bird Area contains the only two remaining alpine breeding colonies.  An artificial colony was established in a protected area on the Kaikōura peninsula as a conservation measure, after six other colonies were wiped out by feral pigs. The birds fly at night, but can become disoriented by bright lights.  Fledglings are particularly vulnerable, and can crash-land on roads in the town.  They are usually unable to take off again, making them vulnerable to being run over by vehicles or succumbing to predation by dogs or cats.  Conservation organizations in Kaikōura rescue stranded birds for later release, and advocate for reduced lighting.

Red-billed gull 

The Red-billed gull also known as tarāpunga, is native to New Zealand.  The Kaikōura peninsula has one of the three largest breeding colonies of these gulls, but the local population is in significant decline. In contrast, there has been an increase in the population of Red-billed gulls at the breeding colony at Otago Peninsula, where there is control of mammalian predators.

Little penguin 
The Little penguin or kororā is found along the Kaikōura coastline. These birds are vulnerable to becoming entangled in fishing nets, and while on land are vulnerable to vehicle impact and predation by rats and domestic dogs. In a recent survey of 75km of Kaikōura coastline, the only breeding colony located was in fragmented areas around the southern part of the Kaikōura peninsula.

Shorebirds

Banded dotterel 
The Double-banded plover, known in New Zealand as the banded dotterel or pohowera, is a species of bird in the plover family that nests on stony beaches around the Kaikōura peninsula and South Bay.  The species is listed as Nationally Vulnerable.   Breeding success of banded dotterels at Kaikōura has been severely affected by predation from cats. A community-driven action plan is being developed to protect the habitat of nesting shorebirds at South Bay, with support from Environment Canterbury, Kaikōura District Council, University of Canterbury and Te Rūnanga o Kaikōura.

Hikurangi Marine Reserve

The reserve was established in 2014, and is the largest and deepest marine reserve adjacent to any of New Zealand's three main islands. No fishing, harvesting or mining is allowed in the reserve.

Kaikōura whale sanctuary 

Dark sky reserve
A new initiative has been launched to apply for recognition as an international dark sky reserve in the Kaikōura area. This could reduce the problems that lighting causes for Hutton's shearwaters. The Kaikōura District Council has already modified streetlighting, to reduce the risk to the birds. In April 2022, the Mayor of Kaikōura said that the dark sky reserve initiative had the full support of the council, and would be a boost to tourist numbers, especially during the winter period.

Economy

In 2020, the GDP of the Kaikōura District was $232 million, with an annual growth for the region of 1.6%. Tourism contributed $57 million to total GDP in Kaikoura District in 2020, and was the top overall category, contributing 24.8% of district GDP.

Infrastructure

Hospital 
Funding was announced in 2013 to rebuild the 100 year old Kaikoura Hospital. It was completed in April 2016. The new building provides space for general practice, physiotherapy, dental, optometry as well as maternity, radiology and medical/trauma stabilisation and resuscitation facilities. It cost $13.4 million to complete.

Kaikoura Civic Centre 

The Kaikōura Civic Centre was completed in 2016. It has a distinctive large "cray pot" on the outside of the building which represents Kaikoura's connection to the sea. It contains offices for the Kaikoura District Council, Kaikoura Library and Kaikoura Museum. A third floor was approved by the Kaikōura District Council in 2011 and the cost rose which led to complaints from rate payers and submissions to the Long Term Plan in 2012 requesting restraint in spending. Long term, finances for the Kaikōura District Council have been suggested to be tenuous.

Hotel 
A $35 million 4.5 star hotel was due to open in September 2021, but work was delayed due to the loss of international tourists because of the Covid-19 virus. It is expected to have 118 bedrooms and provide economic stimulus to Kaikōura.

Transport

Road transport 
The town is on State Highway 1.

Air
Kaikōura also has a small sealed airstrip located 6 km south of the main centre. Kaikoura Airport is mainly used for whale spotting tourist flights but it can also be used by small private and charter flights. It previously had return flights to Wellington and Christchurch operated by Sounds Air. A new service to Wellington has since been started with Air Kaikoura.

Rail

Kaikōura is served by the Main North Line, the northern section of the South Island Main Trunk Railway. The line opened north of Kaikōura on 13 March 1944, while the line south of the town opened on 15 December 1945, the latter completing the full line Christchurch to Picton.

Kaikōura was served by the Coastal Pacific long-distance passenger train, formerly called the TranzCoastal, which connected the town with Christchurch to the south, Picton and the Cook Strait ferries to the north until 2021. Kaikoura Station was the last station in New Zealand to have a refreshment room for passengers, which closed in 1988 when the Coastal Pacific Express (former name for the TranzCoastal) introduced on-board refreshments.

Freight trains also pass through the town, mainly carrying freight between the marshalling yards at Middleton in Christchurch and the Interislander rail ferries at Picton.

The Main North Line (Picton to Christchurch, passing through Kaikōura) suffered damage in the November 2016 earthquake and was closed for repairs, re-opening to freight traffic on 15 September 2017.  The Coastal Pacific resumed running once all repairs were completed in mid 2018.

Education

The Kaikoura District has one secondary school, Kaikoura High School, and four primary schools: Hapuku School, Kaikoura Primary School, Kaikoura Suburban School and St Joseph's School.

Media

Newspapers
The main newspapers for Kaikōura are the Wednesday weekly Kaikoura Star and Monday to Friday late morning daily The Marlborough Express. The early morning Monday-Saturday Christchurch based daily The Press is also available. These papers are all owned by Fairfax New Zealand

Radio
Kaikōura has three locally transmitted radio stations on FM. These are More FM Marlborough (formerly Sounds FM) broadcast from Blenheim during the day and Auckland at night, Blue FM which is a locally broadcast Kaikōura station, and Tahu FM broadcast from Christchurch. Non local transmissions of the following stations can be received: The Breeze (Wellington AM/FM), Radio New Zealand National (Wellington AM/FM), ZM (Wellington and Christchurch FM), Radio Hauraki (Christchurch).

Amenities

Mayfair Theatre 

The Mayfair Theatre is an art deco building on the Esplanade that was first opened in 1935 as a venue for cinema and concerts. In 1985, the building was put up for sale and by 1986, it had been purchased for the town as a result of a community fundraising initiative.

The building was damaged beyond repair in the 2016 Kaikōura earthquake, but community fundraising efforts resulted in the construction of a new cinema and performance venue on the site, retaining the 1934 art deco façade.  After a $3.6 million restoration project, the building was re-opened in November 2020 as the Mayfair Arts and Culture Centre Te Whare Toi ō Kaikōura.  As well as two movie screens, it has space for art exhibitions.

Swimming pool 
The Kaikōura swimming pool on the Esplanade was badly damaged in the 2016 earthquake, leaving Kaikōura without a public pool for five years. A charitable trust was established and fundraising occurred to raise funds to build a replacement pool.

The Kaikōura Aquatic Centre is planned to open in November 2021. It includes a 25m x 12m lap pool, a smaller pool for learners and a toddler pool. Funding of $3.7 million has been raised for the build with the Kaikōura District Council contributing $1million, COVID Recovery Fund contributing $1 million and the Kaikōura Community Op Shop contributing $100,000.

Horse racing 
The Kaikōura race course is located on Bay Parade at South Bay and is administered by the Kaikōura Trotting Club. The club was first established in 1914 with the first Kaikōura Trotting Cup won by a horse called Kintail owned by Albert Edgar and trained by Billie Honeybone. In 2021, the Kaikōura Trotting Cup weekend, normally held in early November was transferred to Addington Raceway in Christchurch due to Covid-19 restrictions.

Golf course 
The Kaikōura golf club was established in 1911 with 39 members joining during the first season. The first nine hole course was located at the South Bay Domain. In 1935, The course moved to a new 9 hole course  with a club house near the Kowhai River. In 1958 three extra holes were added. and in 1960 a further three holes were added. In 1963 the course was extended again to 18 holes. The Koura Bay golf resort just to the north of Kaikōura has a nine hole golf course.

Notable people
Notable people from Kaikōura include: 
 Pat Boot – a middle distance runner who competed at the 1936 Summer Olympics and at the 1938 British Empire Games, winning gold and bronze medals at the latter.
 Thomas Cooke – posthumously awarded the Victoria Cross for gallantry at the Battle of Pozières during the First World War.
 Aston Greathead –  artist
 Ted Howard – conservationist
 Trevor Howse – a Ngāi Tahu leader and researcher
 Ronald Jorgensen – one of the perpetrators of the Bassett Road machine gun murders in 1963
 Ailsa McGilvary –  a bird conservationist, and photographer
 Bert Sandos – a rower who competed at the 1930 British Empire Games, where he won two medals, and at the 1932 Summer Olympics.
Mark Solomon – Māori leader, kaiwhakahaere (chairperson) of Te Rūnanga o Ngāi Tahu, chair of the Canterbury District Health Board
 Julie Syme – community service leader
 Melville Syme – community service leader
  Ian Walker – long serving Chief Fire Officer of the Kaikōura volunteer fire brigade
 Cora Wilding – a physiotherapist noted for her advocacy of outdoor activities and children’s health camps in the 1930s
 John Wood – diplomat and a former chancellor of the University of Canterbury

Gallery

References

External links

 Kaikōura District Council official website
 Kaikōura tourism and information site
 The Hutton's Shearwater Charitable Trust

 
Kaikōura District
Populated places in Canterbury, New Zealand